Isopora is a genus of small polyp stony coral in the phylum Cnidaria.

Species 
The World Register of Marine Species includes the following species in the genus:

 Isopora brueggemanni  (Brook, 1893)
 Isopora crateriformis  (Gardiner, 1898)
 Isopora cuneata  (Dana, 1846)
 Isopora elizabethensis  (Veron, 2000)
 †Isopora matahari  Santodomingo, Wallace & Johnson, 2015 
 Isopora palifera  (Lamarck, 1816)
 Isopora togianensis  (Wallace, 1997)

References 

Acroporidae
Coral reefs
Scleractinia genera